The 1935–36 Rugby Football League season was the 41st season of rugby league football. Thirty teams competed in a single league Championship. The Challenge Cup was contested for the 36th time and the second European Championship took place.

Season summary

Hull F.C. won their third Championship when they defeated Widnes 21–2 in the play-off final. Hull F.C. had also finished the regular season as league leaders.

The Challenge Cup Winners were Leeds who beat Warrington 18–2 in the final.

Two new London clubs join the competition: Acton and Willesden and Streatham and Mitcham.

Liverpool Stanley won the Lancashire League, and Hull F.C. won the Yorkshire League. Salford beat Wigan 15–7 to win the Lancashire County Cup, and Leeds beat York 3–0 to win the Yorkshire County Cup.

Championship

Championship play-offs

Challenge Cup

Leeds beat Warrington 18–2 in the Challenge Cup Final played at Wembley Stadium on Saturday 18 April 1936 before a crowd of 51,250.

Evan Williams' three goals gave Leeds the victory.

This was Leeds’ fourth Challenge Cup Final win in as many Final appearances.

European Championship

The tri-nation tournament was played between November 1935 and February 1936 as single round robin games between England, France and Wales. This was the second Rugby League European Championship, won by Wales.

Match details

References

Sources
 1935–36 Rugby Football League season at wigan.rlfans.com
 The Challenge Cup at The Rugby Football League website

1935 in English rugby league
1936 in English rugby league
Northern Rugby Football League seasons